The House of Commons Standing Committee on Finance (FINA) is a standing committee of the House of Commons of Canada.

Mandate
pre-budget consultations
briefing sessions by departmental officials on federal government programs
examination of planned expenditures of the Department of Finance and the Canada Revenue Agency
review of Monetary Policy Reports of the Governor of the Bank of Canada
review of the Minister of Finance's Economic and Fiscal Update
consideration of proposed finance legislation

Membership

Subcommittees
Subcommittee on Agenda and Procedure (SFIN)

References
Standing Committee on Finance (FINA)

Finance